Bledisloe Glacier is a glacier flowing north west between All-Blacks Nunataks and Wallabies Nunataks, west of the Churchill Mountains. It was named in association with the adjacent All-Blacks and Wallabies Nunataks, and specifically named after the Bledisloe Cup, which is contested between the New Zealand and Australian rugby union teams, the All-Blacks and the Wallabies.

References
 

Glaciers of Oates Land